傅 (Hokkien: Poh) is an ancient Han Chinese surname of imperial origin which is at least 4,000 years old. The great-great-great-grandson of the Yellow Emperor, Dayou, bestowed this surname to his son Fu Yi and his descendants. Dayou is the eldest son of Danzhu and grandson of Emperor Yao.

It is the 84th name on the Hundred Family Surnames poem.
 
It is also a sinicized surname for several clans of Manchurian nobility. During the Qing dynasty, there was an ongoing process of sinicization of surnames, and many Manchurian clans such as the Fu, Fuca/Fucha, Fugiya, Fuciri, Fulkuru, Fujuri and Fulha' adopted 傅 or 富 as their Han surname.

It can also be 符, 苻, 付, 扶, 伏, and 富.

Notable people (in chronological order) 
Fu Yue (傅說) (1324–1265 BC) – A Shang dynasty premier during the reign of Emperor Wu Ding.
Fu Kuan (傅寬) (died 189 BC) – Marquis of Yangling (posthumously Marquis Jing), a follower of Liu Bang.
Fu Jing (傅精) (died 165 BC) – 2nd Marquis Jing.
Fu Ze (傅則) (died 153 BC) – 3rd Marquis Jing.
Fu Yan (傅偃) (died 122 BC) – 4th and final Marquis Jing. In 122 BC he was tried for plotting a rebellion with the King of Huainan, Liu An. His state was abolished when he died.
Fu Jiezi (傅介子) – A Han dynasty officer who assassinated the king of the Xiongnu in 77 BC.
Consort Fu (傅昭儀) (died 3 BC) – A Han dynasty imperial consort and favorite of Emperor Yuan
Fu Xi (傅喜) – A Han dynasty Marshall of State from 6 – 1 BC.
Empress Fu (Ai) (傅皇后)) (died 1 BC) – A Han dynasty Empress.
 Fu Jun (傅俊) (1st century AD) – One of the Yuntai 28 generals who served Emperor Guangwu of Han.
Fu Yu (died 87 AD) – Colonel-Protector in Han dynasty China. Killed in a Ch'iang rebellion in 87 AD.
Fu Xie (died 187 AD) – Han dynasty imperial court adviser.
Fu Xun (傅巽) – A Politician of the state of Cao Wei during the Three Kingdoms period.
Fu Jia – An official of Cao Wei (aka Fu Gu) (209–255 AD)
Fu Qian (傅僉) (216–263 AD) – A General of Shu Han during the Three Kingdoms period.
Fu Xuan (傅玄) (217–278 AD) – A politician, scholar, writer, and poet during the period from the Cao Wei to Western Jin dynasty. 
Fu Hu (傅虎) (died 312 AD) – A Han Zhao dynasty general who sacrificed his life to save Emperor Liu Yao.
 Fu Chang (died 330 AD) – A writer of the Later Zhao dynasty.
 Fu Liang (傅亮) (374–426 AD) – A high-level official of the Liu Song dynasty, who, along with his colleagues Xu Xianzhi and Xie Hui, deposed Emperor Shao.
Fu Qi (6th century AD) (傅岐) – An adviser to Emperor Wu of Liang.
 Fu Yi (傅奕) (554–639 AD) – A Sui dynasty official and historiographer during the reign of Emperor Gaozu of the Tang dynasty.
Fu Youyi (傅遊藝) (died 691 AD) – An official of Wu Zetian's Zhou dynasty.
Fu Wenjing (傅文靜) – A Tang dynasty magistrate instrumental in the early rise of Niu Xianke.
 Fu Yaoyu (1024–1091 AD)
Fu Youde (傅友德) (died 1394 AD) – A General and Navy Commander of the Ming dynasty who subdued the Mongols with an army of 300,000 soldiers.
Fu An (died 1429 AD)
Fu Shan (1607–1684 AD) – A Ming and Qing dynasty artist
Fu Honglie (傅弘烈) (died 1680 AD)
Fu Nai (1758–1811 AD)
Fu Zuoyi (1895–1974 AD)
Fu Daqing (1900–c.1944 AD)
Fu Lei (1908–1966 AD) – Translator and art critic
Poh Kimseng (傅金城) (1912–1980 AD) – Chinese sprinter
Poh Soo Kai (傅樹介) (born 1930 AD) – Singaporean politician
Fou Ts'ong (born 1934 AD) – Pianist, son of Fu Lei
Alexander Fu Sheng (傅聲) (1954–1983 AD) – Hong Kong Martial Arts Film Star
Xiaolan Fu – Chinese economist
Marco Fu (born 1978 AD) – Professional snooker player from Hong Kong
Leslie Fu (born 1992 AD) – Twitch streamer
Fu Haitao (born 1993 AD) – Chinese triple jumper
Fu Jing (born 1995 AD) – Singer, actress, former member of Rocket Girls 101
Fu Yuanhui (傅园慧) (born 1996 AD) – Chinese swimmer
 Sally Poh Bee Eng (傅美英) – Singaporean murder victim
 Crystal Poh (傅诗琪) – Singaporean murder victim

苻 
Fu Pi (?–386 AD)
Foo Chin Chin (符真真; 1971–1990), a Singaporean and one of the victims of the 1990 Ng Soo Hin murders

付 
 Fu Yiwei – Chinese female curler

扶

伏 

 Fu Sheng 3rd century BC
 Fu Shou Empress of Han dynasty

富 

Fu Bi (1004–1083 AD)

See also
 Empress Fu (disambiguation)
 Empress Dowager Fu (disambiguation)

References

Chinese-language surnames
Multiple Chinese surnames